Return to Heaven Denied is the second album by Italian power metal band, Labyrinth. It was the first album to feature Rob Tyrant on vocals. In 2010, the band released a follow-up to the album, titled Return to Heaven Denied Pt. II: "A Midnight Autumn's Dream"  In 2021, it was elected by Metal Hammer as the 17th best symphonic metal album of all time.

Track listing 
 "Moonlight" - 5:43
 "New Horizons" - 6:22
 "The Night of Dreams" - 4:47
 "Lady Lost in Time" - 5:32
 "State of Grace" - 3:08
 "Heaven Denied" - 4:57
 "Thunder" - 4:21
 "Feel" - 4:22
 "Time After Time" - 5:07
 "Falling Rain" - 6:26
 "Die for Freedom" - 7:02

Credits
 Rob Tyrant - vocals
 Olaf Thorsen - guitar
 Anders Rain - guitar
 Chris Breeze - bass
 Andrew Mc Pauls - keyboards
 Ken Taylor - keyboards
 Frank Andiver - drums (Studio)
 Mat Stancioiu - drums (Pictured with the band, but did not perform on the record)

References 

1996 albums
Labyrinth (band) albums
Metal Blade Records albums